Ghost Of Yesterday is an EP released by Scottish pianist Bill Wells and former Belle & Sebastian member Isobel Campbell, under the name of The Gentle Waves. It covers songs by Billie Holiday. The album was released in July 2002.

Track listing
"All Alone"
"Ghost Of Yesterday"
"Who Needs You?"
"Please Don't Do It In Here"
"Preacher Boy"
"Tell Me More And More (And Then Some)"
"Somebody's On My Mind"

External links
 Official website Info on the album

2002 EPs